The following article presents a summary of the 2005 football (soccer) season in Paraguay.

First division results
The first division tournament was divided in two sections: the Apertura and the Clausura and had 10 teams participating in a two round all-play-all system. The team with the most points at the end of the two rounds was crowned as the champion.

Torneo Apertura

Torneo Clausura

Championship game playoff
Since Cerro Porteño won both the Apertura and Clausura tournaments they were declared as the national champions and no playoff game was played.

Relegation / Promotion
 General Caballero ZC automatically relegated to the second division after finishing last in the aggregate points table.
 2 de Mayo and Club Fernando de la Mora promoted to the first division by finishing first and second respectively in the second division tournament.

Qualification to international competitions
Cerro Porteño qualified to the 2006 Copa Libertadores by winning the Torneo Apertura and Torneo Clausura; and to the 2005 Copa Sudamericana and 2006 Copa Sudamericana  by winning the Apertura and Clausura tournaments.

Runners-up playoff game
Libertad (runners-up of the Clausura) qualified to the Copa Libertadores 2006 by winning the runners-up playoff game against Guaraní (runners-up of the Apertura) by an aggregate score of 5-3.

Copa Sudamericana 2005 Qualifiers
Semifinals

Final

Guaraní qualified to the Copa Sudamericana 2005 by winning the final.

Copa Sudamericana 2006 Qualifiers
Played between the Clausura tournament winner and the second-best finisher in the aggregate point table (Nacional).

Lower divisions results

Paraguayan teams in international competitions
Copa Libertadores 2005:
Cerro Porteño: round of 16
Club Libertad: group-stage
Tacuary: preliminary round
Copa Sudamericana 2005:
Cerro Porteño: round of 16
Club Guaraní: preliminary first round

Paraguay national team 
The following table lists all the games played by the Paraguay national football team in official competitions during 2005.

References
 Paraguay 2005 by Eli Schmerler and Juan Pablo Andrés at RSSSF
 Diario ABC Color

 
Seasons in Paraguayan football
Paraguay 2005